Embryo splitting may refer to:
 when spontaneous, the natural way in which identical twins are formed.
 when artificially induced, a method of cloning. See Cloning#Methods